Bleed the Sky is the second and final album released by the nu metal band Reveille from Harvard, Massachusetts. It was originally released on September 18, 2001 through Elektra Records.

The album's initial 2001 release featured 13 tracks with the track "What You Got" being the first single. In the 2002 re-release a bonus track was added; a remixed version of "Inside Out" which went on to be the second single of this album.

Reception
In his review, AllMusic's Tom Semioli described the album's music as a "relentless brick wall of sound". He wrote "Bleed the Sky is all about loud guitars and permutations of pentatonic riffs" and that it is "an album that will please genre fans without fail."

Track listing

Re-release track listing (2002)

Trivia
A portion of the track "Unborn" was censored by the record label.
During the album session, there was an intro for the song "Unborn".

Personnel
 Drew Simollardes - Vocals
 Steve Miloszewski - Guitar, Programming
 Greg Sullivan - Guitar, Backing Vocals
 Carl Randolph - Bass
 Justin Wilson - Drums
 Howard Benson - Additional Programming
 Stephen Richards - Vocals (12)
Scooter Ward - Vocals (14)
 Aimee Allen - Backing Vocals (12, 13)
 Mixed by Mike Plotnikoff (1, 3-14)
 Mixed by Chris Lord-Alge (2)
 Engineered by Mike Plotnikoff
 Engineered by Bobby Brooks
 Additional Engineering by John Ship
 Assistant Engineers: Sam Storey, Ernie Vigil, Jeff Thomas

References

2001 albums
Reveille (band) albums